Scopula achroa, the Tasmanian saltmarsh looper moth, is a moth of the family Geometridae. It was described by Oswald Bertram Lower in 1902. It is only found in the saltmarshes of Tasmania.

Adults have brown wings with zigzag markings.

References

Endemic fauna of Tasmania
Moths described in 1902
achroa
Moths of Australia